Ian Thomas may refer to:

 Ian Thomas (baseball) (born 1987), baseball player
 Ian Thomas (cricketer) (born 1979), Welsh cricketer
 Ian Thomas (dressmaker) (died 1993), dressmaker to Queen Elizabeth II
 Ian Thomas (umpire) (born 1950), Australian cricket umpire
 Ian Thomas (American football) (born 1995), American football tight end
 Ian Thomas (Belgian musician) (born 1997), Belgian singer
 Ian Thomas (Canadian musician) (born 1950), Canadian singer-songwriter
 Ian Thomas (Town Clerk), Town Clerk of London
 Ian C. Thomas (born 1963), Australian comics artist
 Ian F. Thomas (born 1976), American installation artist
 W. Ian Thomas (1914–2007), Christian speaker and author

See also